James Barroll Ricaud (February 11, 1808 – January 24, 1866) was an American politician.

Born in Baltimore, Maryland, Ricaud attended the common schools and graduated from Washington College of Chestertown, Maryland, in 1828.  He studied law, was admitted to the bar in 1829, and commenced practice in Chestertown.  He served as a member of the Maryland House of Delegates in 1834, served in the Maryland State Senate from 1836 to 1844, and served as presidential elector on the Whig tickets in 1840 and 1844.

Ricaud was elected as the candidate of the American Party to the Thirty-fourth and Thirty-fifth Congresses, serving from March 4, 1855, to March 3, 1859.  He later resumed the practice of his profession and was appointed associate judge of the second Maryland judicial district in 1864 by Governor Augustus Bradford and served during the May term.  He died in Chestertown and is interred in St. Paul's Church Cemetery.

References

External links

1808 births
1866 deaths
Politicians from Baltimore
Maryland Whigs
Know-Nothing members of the United States House of Representatives from Maryland
1840 United States presidential electors
1844 United States presidential electors
Members of the Maryland House of Delegates
Maryland state senators
Maryland state court judges
Washington College alumni
19th-century American politicians
19th-century American judges
Members of the United States House of Representatives from Maryland